The Moldovan Ground Forces, known officially as Land Forces Command is the land armed-forces branch of the National Army of the Moldovan Armed Forces. The Moldovan Ground Forces date back to the dissolution of the Soviet Union between 1991 and 1992.  the Moldovan Ground Forces consists of around 4,000 personnel.

History 

At the beginning of 1994, the Moldovan army (under the Ministry of Defense) consisted of 9,800 men organized into three motorized infantry brigades, one artillery brigade, and one reconnaissance/assault battalion. Its equipment consisted of fifty-six ballistic missile defenses; seventy-seven armored personnel carriers and sixty-seven "look-alikes;" eighteen 122 mm and fifty-three 152 mm towed artillery units; nine 120 mm combined guns/mortars; seventy AT-4 Spigot, nineteen AT-5 Spandrel, and twenty-seven AT-6 Spiral anti-tank guided weapons; a 73 mm SPG-9 recoilless launcher, forty-five MT-12 100 mm anti-tank guns; and thirty ZU-23 23 mm and twelve S-60 57 mm air defense guns. Moldova has received some arms from former Soviet stocks maintained on the territory of the republic as well as undetermined quantities of arms from Romania, particularly at the height of the fighting with Transnistria.

By 2006–2007, the Army had been reduced to a strength of 5,710, including three motor rifle brigades, one artillery brigade, and independent SF and engineer battalions, plus an independent guard unit. Equipment included 44 BMD-1 AIFV, and 266 APCs, including 91 TAB-71s, as well as 227 artillery pieces. The modern Land Forces Command was established on 25 December 2008. In 2010, the Army had been further reduced to 5,148 (3,176 professional soldiers and 1,981 conscripts) plus 2,379 paramilitary forces. The reserve force consists of 66,000 troops. Equipment included 44 BMD-1P infantry fighting vehicles, 164 APCs (100 wheeled, including 89 Romanian TAB-71Ms, and 64 tracked, BTRs and MT-LBs), 148 artillery pieces (69 towed, 9 2S9 self-propelled guns, and 11 "Urugan" multiple rocket launchers); 117 Anti-tank missiles (Soviet-built AT-4s, AT-5s, and AT-6s), 138+ recoilless guns, 36 towed antitank guns and 37 towed anti-aircraft guns (23mm and 57mm).

Structure

 Infantry Units:
 1st Motorized Infantry Brigade "Moldova" – Bălți
 2nd Motorized Infantry Brigade "Stefan Cel Mare" – Chișinău
 3rd Motorized Infantry Brigade "Dacia" – Cahul
 22nd Peacekeeping Battalion – Chișinău
 Artillery Division "Prut" – Ungheni
 Independent Engineer Battalion "Codru" – Negrești, Strășeni
 Independent Radio Regiment "Basarabia" – Durleşti, Chișinău
 Independent Special Forces Battalion "Fulger" – Durlești, Chișinău
 Independent Chemical Protection Company – Negrești, Strășeni
 Guard Battalion – Chișinău
 Ceremonial Honour Guard Company 
 Guard Company
 Military Police Company
 General Staff Company
 Auto Company
 Insurance Company
 1st Independent Battalion of Peacekeepers – Cocieri, Dubăsari District
 3rd Independent Battalion of Peacekeepers – Coșnița, Dubăsari District
 Independent Infantry Company of Peacekeepers – Varnița, Anenii Noi

Gallery

Equipment

See also
 Trupele de Carabinieri (Gendarmerie-type force of the Republic of Moldova)

References

Military of Moldova